Sinocyclocheilus jii is a species of ray-finned fish in the genus Sinocyclocheilus.

References 

jii
Fish described in 1992